= Space Hippie =

Sneaker collection

Nike Space Hippie
- Type: Sneakers
- Inventor: Nike, Inc.
- Inception: 2020; 6 years ago
- Manufacturer: Nike
- Website: nike.com/space-hippie

Space Hippie is a line of sneakers by Nike engineered from recycled materials, released by the company in 2020.

== Overview ==
Nike's Space Hippie sneakers and their packaging are made factory scraps. from "rPoly", an amalgam of recycled water bottles, t-shirts, and yarn. Their midsole uses rubber that Nike had used in its redesign of a Miami high school football field amid other foam scraps. Their design borrows from moon shoes, based on their chunky, recycled, speckled foam soles. The Space Hippie knit upper uses earth tones while other parts of the shoe have bright orange accents.

There are four sneakers in the collection, "Space Hippie 1" through 4. Space Hippie 3 is a futuristic high-top with exposed Flyease lacing, which lets wearers adjust the fit by pulling on straps rather than tying lacing. Space Hippie 4 is designed for women and has a light gray sole where the other sneakers use light blue.

Apart from the orange and gray color scheme used in the original line, Nike released additional colorways in 2020. The "Volt", released in July, uses light blue and light gray. The "Wheat White" colorway for the Space Hippie 01 uses a faded black and released in August. Space Hippie 04 was released in September in "Astronomy Blue".

== Production ==
The sneakers were designed to use scrap materials yet remain within the Nike brand aesthetic. Nike has said the sneakers have their lowest carbon footprint.

Nike announced the sneaker in February 2020. Originally set for release in April 2020, they were delayed due to the COVID-19 pandemic and released in June.
